CIRANO (Centre Interuniversitaire de Recherche en Analyse des Organisations) is a research center that brings together a number of researches from several universities in Montreal (Canada), with the purpose of creation and transfer of knowledge on the analysis of organizations. It facilitates research in a variety of disciplines: economics, finance, management, information systems, computer science and operational research, psychology, sociology, political science, law, history, and medicine.

Notable fellows
Claude Castonguay
Alain Dubuc
Monique Jérôme-Forget
Robert Lacroix
Claude Montmarquette

References

Research institutes in Canada